Avenue des Ternes is an avenue in the 17th arrondissement of Paris, between Place des Ternes and boulevard Gouvion-Saint-Cyr. It is on both sides of place Tristan-Bernard.

Description 
Avenue des Ternes begins at the intersection of number 1, Place des Ternes and number 49, avenue de Wagram. It ends at number 59, boulevard Gouvion-Saint-Cyr. It passes through the Quartier des Ternes, after which it was named on 23 May 1863.

Ternes
17th arrondissement of Paris